{{DISPLAYTITLE:C12H16N2S}}
The molecular formula C12H16N2S (molar mass: 220.33 g/mol, exact mass: 220.1034 u) may refer to:

 Morantel
 Xylazine

Molecular formulas